A drop attack is a sudden fall without loss of consciousness. Drop attacks stem from diverse mechanisms, including orthopedic causes (for example, leg weakness and knee instability), hemodynamic causes (for example, transient vertebrobasilar insufficiency, a type of interruption of blood flow to the brain), and neurologic causes (such as epileptic seizures or unstable vestibular function), among other reasons. Those affected typically experience abrupt leg weakness, sometimes after sudden movement of the head. The weakness may persist for hours.

The term "drop attack" is used to categorize otherwise unexplained falls from a wide variety of causes and is considered ambiguous medical terminology; drop attacks are currently reported much less often than in the past, possibly as a result of better diagnostic precision. By definition, drop attacks exclude syncopal falls (fainting), which involve short loss of consciousness. In neurology, the term "drop attack" is used to describe certain types of seizure which occur in epilepsy.  Drop attacks that have a vestibular origin within the inner ear may be experienced by some people in the later stages of Ménière's disease (these may be referred to as Tumarkin [drop] attacks, or as Tumarkin's otolithic crisis).

Drop attacks often occur in elderly people. Falls in older adults happen for many reasons, and the goals of health care include preventing any preventable falls and correctly diagnosing any falls that do happen.

References

Medical terminology